Grand Junction is a city between the border of Hardeman and Fayette County, Tennessee, United States. The population was 325 at the 2010 census, and was estimated to be 303 in 2015.

It has been called the "Bird Dog Capital of the World" and serves as the location of the National Bird Dog Museum.

History

Grand Junction was founded in 1858. It was named after the "Grand Junction" of the Memphis and Charleston Railroad and the Mississippi Central Railroad. The town was a railroad town, with its own newspaper, two saloons, three hotels, a livery stable, and other businesses. During the Civil War, the Union Army held the city for approximately three years. Also during the Civil War General U.S. Grant established a “Contraband Camp” of thousands of former enslaved people, providing shelter, education etc. prior to the Emancipation Proclamation. (Ron Chernow, p 230) In 1878 a yellow fever epidemic struck the town and killed more than half of the 150 residents. The town was incorporated in 1901.

Geography 
Grand Junction is located in southwestern Hardeman County at  (35.048023, -89.190177). A small portion of the town extends west into Fayette County. Tennessee State Route 57 runs through the city, leading east  to Middleton and west  to La Grange. Tennessee State Route 18 runs past the western edge of Grand Junction, leading northeast  to Bolivar and southwest  to the Mississippi border, beyond which Mississippi Highway 7 continues southwest  to Holly Springs. Tennessee State Route 368 is a local highway that runs through downtown Grand Junction.

Demographics

As of the census of 2000, there were 301 people, 125 households, and 86 families residing in the city. The racial makeup of the city was 58.47% White, 40.53% African American, 0.33% Native American, and 0.66% from two or more races. Hispanic or Latino of any race were 1.00% of the population.

There were 125 households, out of which 24.0% had children under the age of 18 living with them, 51.2% were married couples living together, 16.8% had a female householder with no husband present, and 30.4% were non-families. 27.2% of all households were made up of individuals, and 19.2% had someone living alone who was 65 years of age or older. The average household size was 2.41 and the average family size was 2.97.

In the city, the population was spread out, with 25.6% under the age of 18, 6.3% from 18 to 24, 23.3% from 25 to 44, 25.2% from 45 to 64, and 19.6% who were 65 years of age or older. The median age was 40 years. For every 100 females, there were 81.3 males. For every 100 females age 18 and over, there were 73.6 males.

The median income for a household in the city was $29,306, and the median income for a family was $36,375. Males had a median income of $33,750 versus $20,469 for females. The per capita income for the city was $13,304. About 8.4% of families and 11.1% of the population were below the poverty line, including 16.3% of those under the age of eighteen and 7.4% of those 65 or over. Most of those below the poverty line receive federal aid.

Climate
Grand Junction has a humid subtropical climate, with four distinct seasons. The summer months (late May to late September) are persistently hot and humid due to moisture encroaching from the Gulf of Mexico, with afternoon temperatures frequently above 90 degrees Fahrenheit. Afternoon thunderstorms are frequent during some summers, but usually brief, lasting no longer than an hour. Early autumn is drier and mild, but can remain hot until late October. Abrupt but short-lived cold snaps are common. Late autumn is rainy and colder, December being the third rainiest month of the year. Fall foliage becomes especially vibrant after the first frost, typically early November, and lasts until early December. Winters are mild, but cold snaps can occur. Mild spells sometimes occur January and February. Snowfall is not abundant but does occur during most winters, with one or two major winter weather events occurring by the end of March. Spring often begins in late February or early March, following the onset of a sharp warmup. This season is also known as "severe weather season" due to the higher frequency of tornadoes, hail, and thunderstorms producing winds greater than 58 mph (93 km/h). Average rainfall is slightly higher during the spring months than the rest of the year. Historically, April is the month with the highest frequency of tornadoes, though tornadoes have occurred every month of the year. Grand Junction-area historical tornado activity is above Tennessee state average, and 155% greater than the overall U.S. average. Grand Junction is sunny about 62.5% of the time.

Economy

A. Schulman has a manufacturing facility in Grand Junction. The town has many small local businesses, including a clothing boutique, antique shops, two local banks, several quick-marts a Dollar General store and a Family Dollar store.

Arts and culture

The National Bird Dog Museum (NBDM) is located in Grand Junction, as is the Field Trial Hall of Fame and Wildlife Heritage Center, which shares space with the NBDM. The location of the NBDM and the history of the area in regards to hunting has earned the town the title of the "Bird Dog Capital of the World". Ames Plantation, the former home of Hobart Ames, is also located in the area. The town is also home to the National Field Trial Championships, which are held at Ames Plantation. Grand Junction's library, serves area residents and consists of 2 staff member and volunteers. As of 2011, over 1,380 patrons visited the library, checking out items over 3,300 times. The Wilder Community Center serves as a community hall and senior center. Grand Junction also has one of the oldest and most active Ruritan clubs in Tennessee.

Annual events

A Christmas parade is held each year with a tree-lighting ceremony. There is also an annual BBQ Cookoff contest help each year in April that draws a large crowd and plenty of contestants vying for the "Golden Pig".

Other notable landmarks

Many of the original buildings are still maintained within Grand Junction. Rogers and Sons Marble Works, established in 1879, is still standing and the old railroad depot still exists. N.T. Richardson's General Merchandise Store is still standing and stocked from when it finally closed, which was run by N.T. Richardson until his death at 104 years old.

Education

Grand Junction has one elementary school, Grand Junction Elementary School, as well as a Head Start Program. There is also a newly renovated local library with meeting areas for different events.

Media
Although in a rural area, Grand Junction has many local television and radio stations able to be received by residents with basic outdoor antennas. Eleven television stations are available over the air in Grand Junction, and over sixteen radio stations are also able to be received.

Infrastructure

Major thoroughfares
 State Route 57
 State Route 18
 State Route 368

Utilities

Grand Junction provides a number of services to their population. The Grand Junction Post Office provides mail services and the Bolivar Electric Company and Hardeman/Fayette Utility Dist. provides electricity and gas, respectively. The city handles waste disposal, sewage and water needs. Comcast provides cable services, internet and phone services and AT&T, landline phone service, internet and television services.

Notable people

Bobby Parks, basketball player
Thomas Hearns, boxer

References

External links

 Official website
 Ames Plantation

Cities in Tennessee
Cities in Fayette County, Tennessee
Cities in Hardeman County, Tennessee
Memphis metropolitan area
Majority-minority cities and towns in Tennessee